Ralstonia insidiosa is a Gram-negative, environmental bacterium. It has been shown to be a pathogenic in immunocompromised patients in hospital settings. This bacterium is closely related to Ralstonia pickettii.

References

External links 
Type strain of Ralstonia insidiosa at BacDive -  the Bacterial Diversity Metadatabase

Burkholderiaceae
Bacteria described in 2003